The purple chimaera or purple ghostshark (Hydrolagus purpurescens) is a species of fish in the family Chimaeridae found off Japan and Hawaii. Its natural habitat is open seas.

References

purple chimaera
Fish of Japan
Fish of Hawaii
purple chimaera
Taxonomy articles created by Polbot